was a Japanese politician of the Democratic Party of Japan, a member of the House of Councillors in the Diet (national legislature). A native of Tomakomai, Hokkaidō and high school graduate, he had served in the assembly of Chiba Prefecture for five terms from 1987 to 2007. He was elected to the House of Councillors for the first time in 2007.

References

External links 
 Ken Kagaya's obituary 

1943 births
2014 deaths
Members of the House of Councillors (Japan)
Democratic Party of Japan politicians